Cloghanboy (Strain) is a townland in Athlone, County Westmeath, Ireland. The townland is in the civil parish of St. Mary's.

The townland is located in the north of the town, with the M6 motorway running through the middle. Cloghanboy (Homan) borders the townland to the west, and Cloghanboy (Cooke) is to the north.

References 

Townlands of County Westmeath